Panzer Elite is a World War II tank simulation game in which the player controls a platoon of 4 or 5 tanks on either the German or American side. The game was developed by Wings Simulation for the Microsoft Windows platform, and was first published by Wing's parent company Psygnosis in 1999.

Reception

The game received "favorable" reviews according to the review aggregation website GameRankings.

Awards
Panzer Elite was a finalist for Computer Games Strategy Pluss 1999 "Simulation Game of the Year" award, which ultimately went to MiG Alley. The editors called Panzer Elite "one of the most well-rounded tank simulations in recent history."

References

External links
 

 
1999 video games
Tank simulation video games
Video games developed in Germany
Windows games
Windows-only games
Embracer Group franchises
JoWooD Entertainment games
Psygnosis games